Haeberli (or Häberli) is a surname of Swiss origin.

It may refer to:
 Paul Haeberli, an American computer graphics researcher
 Thomas Häberli (born 1974), a Swiss  football  striker

German-language surnames
Swiss-German surnames